Arthur Rock (born August 19, 1926) is an American businessman and investor. Based in Silicon Valley, California, he was an early investor in major firms including Intel, Apple, Scientific Data Systems and Teledyne.

Early life
Rock was born and raised in Rochester, New York, in a Jewish family. He was an only child and his father owned a small candy store where Rock worked as a youth. He joined the U.S. Army during World War II but the war ended before he was deployed. He then went to college on the G.I. Bill. He graduated with a Bachelor's degree in business administration from Syracuse University in 1948 and earned an MBA from Harvard Business School in 1951.

Career
Rock started his career in 1951 as a securities analyst in New York City, and then joined the corporate finance department of Hayden, Stone & Company in New York, where he focused on raising money for small high-technology companies. In 1957, when the "traitorous eight" left Shockley Semiconductor Laboratory, Rock was the one who helped them find a place to go: he convinced Sherman Fairchild to start Fairchild Semiconductor.

In 1961, he moved to California. Along with Thomas J. Davis Jr., he formed the San Francisco venture capital firm Davis & Rock.

Rock was a member of Apple Inc.'s board when Steve Jobs was ousted in the mid 1980s.

In 2003, Rock donated $25 million to the Harvard Business School to establish the Arthur Rock Center for Entrepreneurship.

Politics

Rock has donated to many political causes, especially in the area of education. He has donated to more than 30 school board elections across the country. Recently, in 2021, he donated over $500,000 to the 2022 San Francisco Board of Education recall elections.

Awards
 1987 EY Entrepreneur of The Year Award Recipient, Northern California Region
 1989 Golden Plate Award of the American Academy of Achievement

Personal life
He is married to lawyer Toni Rembe. Together with his wife, Rock has been a supporter of Teach For America. The organization's annual Social Innovation Award is named in their honor.

Rock was portrayed by actor J. K. Simmons in the 2013 biographical drama Jobs.

See also 
 Rock's law
 Triumph of the Nerds

References

External links 

 Gordon Moore and Arthur Rock Oral History Panel interview, July 2014, California

1926 births
Living people
American billionaires
American computer businesspeople
American financial analysts
American investors
Jewish American philanthropists
Philanthropists from New York (state)
Harvard Business School alumni
Martin J. Whitman School of Management alumni
Private equity and venture capital investors
Businesspeople from Rochester, New York
Directors of Apple Inc.
United States Army personnel of World War II
21st-century American Jews